Bobasakoa is a municipality in Madagascar. It belongs to the district of Antsiranana II, which is a part of Diana Region. According to 2001 census the population of Bobasakoa was 6,309.

Only primary schooling is available in town. The majority 98.9% of the population are farmers, and the most important crop is rice.  Services provide employment for 0.1% of the population, while fishing employs 1% of the population.

References and notes 

Populated places in Diana Region